Igor Alexandrovich Moiseyev (– 2 November 2007) was a Soviet choreographer. Moiseyev was widely acclaimed as the greatest 20th-century choreographer of character dance, a dance style similar to folk dance but with more professionalism and theatrics.

Life and career
Born in Kiev, Russian Empire, he was the only child of a Russian lawyer and a French-Romanian seamstress. His family lived in Paris until he was 8, and throughout his life he spoke to Western journalists in fluent French. Moiseyev graduated from the Bolshoi Theatre ballet school in 1924 and danced in the theatre until 1939. His first choreography in the Bolshoi was Footballer in 1930 and the last was Spartacus in 1954.

Since the early 1930s, he staged acrobatic parades on Red Square and finally came up with the idea of establishing the Theatre of Folk Art. In 1936, Vyacheslav Molotov put him in charge of the new dance company, which has since been known as the Moiseyev Ballet. Among about 200 dances he created for his company, some humorously represented the game of football and guerrilla warfare. After visiting Belarus he choreographed a Belarusian "folk" dance Bulba ("Potato"), which over the years indeed became a Belarusian folk dance. According to the Encyclopædia Britannica, Moiseyev's work has been especially admired "for the balance that it maintained between authentic folk dance and theatrical effectiveness".

Moiseyev was named People's Artist of the USSR in 1953, Hero of Socialist Labor in 1976, received the Lenin Prize (1967, for the dance show A Road to the Dance), four Stalin/USSR State Prizes (1942, 1947, 1952, 1985), Russian Federation State Prize (1996), was awarded numerous orders and medals of the Soviet Union, Spain and many other countries. On the day of his centenary, Moiseyev became the first Russian to receive Order of Merit for the Fatherland, 1st class — the highest civilian decoration of the Russian Federation. In 2001, he was awarded the UNESCO Mozart Medal for outstanding contribution to world music culture. He died in Moscow on 2 November 2007 aged 101.

He was married at least twice. In 1940, he married the dancer  and his daughter from that marriage, Olga, was a dancer in the Moiseyev Ballet. His grandson, was a performer in the Moiseyev Ballet as of 2015.

Today, the repertoire of the Igor Moiseyev Ballet includes choreographic works by Moiseyev, starting in 1937. Approximately, there are nearly 300 original works of Moiseyev.

Dances
Ballets:
 Polovtsian Dances (music by Alexander Borodin)
 At the skating-rink (music by Johann Strauss)
 Night on Bald Mountain (music by Modest Mussorgsky)
 Spanish ballad (music by Pablo Luna)
 Evening in the Tavern
 Jewish suite "Family joy"

Dance paintings:
 Football 
 Guerrillas
 Day on a ship (Engine room, Yablochko)
 Labour Day
 The buffoons (music by Nikolai Rimsky-Korsakov) 
and many dances

Honours and awards

USSR and the Russian Federation
 Hero of Socialist Labour (20 January 1976)
 Three Orders of Lenin (1958, 1976, 1985)
 Order of the October Revolution (1981)
 Order of the Red Banner of Labour, twice (1940, 1966)
 Order of the Badge of Honour (1937)
 Order of Merit for the Fatherland;
1st class (21 January 2006) – for outstanding contribution to the development of domestic and international choreographic art, many years of creative activity
2nd class (12 June 1999) – for outstanding contribution to cultural development and in connection with the 75th anniversary of creative activity
3rd class (28 December 1995) – for services to the state, an outstanding contribution to the development of choreographic art
 Order of Friendship (11 April 1994) – for his great personal contribution to the development of choreographic art and world culture

Foreign
 Order of St. Alexander with a crown (Bulgaria, 1945)
 Officer of the Order of Culture, 1st class (Hungary, 1954) and 2nd class (1960)
 Officer of the Order of Culture (Hungary, 1989)
 Commander of the Order of Merit of the Republic of Hungary (1997)
 Commander of the Order of "Citizenship Award" (Spain, 1996)
 Order "Danaker" (Kyrgyzstan, 2007)
 National Order of the Cedar (Lebanon, 1956)
 Order of Sukhbaatar (Mongolia, 1976)
 Order of the Polar Star (Mongolia) (1947)
 Knight's Cross of the Order of Polonia Restituta (Poland, 1946)
 Commander of the Order of Merit of the Republic of Poland (1996)
 Officer of the Order of Culture (Romania, 1945)
 Order of Prince Yaroslav the Wise, 5th class (Ukraine, 3 March 2006) – for outstanding contribution to the development of cultural ties between Ukraine and the Russian Federation, the long-term selfless artistic activity
 Order of Merit, 3rd class (Ukraine, 1999)
 Order of the White Lion, 3rd class (Czechoslovakia, 1980)
 Gold Star of the Order of Brotherhood and Unity (Yugoslavia 1946)
 Commander of the Order of Merit of the Kingdom of Spain (1996)
 UNESCO Mozart Medal
 Order of May (2004)

Award
 Lenin Prize (1967)
 Stalin Prizes, 1st class (1942, 1952) and 2nd class (1947)
 USSR State Prize (1985)
 Russian Federation State Prize in Literature and Art in 1995 (27 May 1996)

Titles
 People's Artist of USSR (1953)
 People's Artist of RSFSR (1944)
 People's Artist of the Moldavian SSR (1950)
 People's Artist of the Kyrgyz SSR (1976)
 Honoured Artist of the RSFSR (1942)
 People's Artist of Buryat ASSR (1940)

|-
! colspan="3" style="background: red;" | Ovation
|-

|-

See also
 List of Russian dancers

References

External links 

 Official Youtube channel of the Igor Moiseyev Ballet
 Official site of the Igor Moiseyev Ballet
 Obituary in The Times, 6 November 2007
 The Guardian's tribute to Moiseyev 
 Autobiography 

1906 births
2007 deaths
Dance teachers
Dancers from Kyiv
Soviet male dancers
Russian centenarians
Soviet choreographers
Russian people of French descent
Russian people of Romanian descent
Heroes of Socialist Labour
Recipients of the Order "For Merit to the Fatherland", 1st class
Stalin Prize winners
Recipients of the USSR State Prize
Recipients of the Order of the White Lion
People's Artists of the USSR
Recipients of the Order of Lenin
Recipients of the National Order of the Cedar
Knights of the Order of Polonia Restituta
Commanders of the Order of Merit of the Republic of Poland
Commander's Crosses of the Order of Merit of the Republic of Hungary (civil)
Recipients of the Order of Prince Yaroslav the Wise
Recipients of the Order of Merit (Ukraine), 3rd class
Commanders of the Order of the White Lion
Lenin Prize winners
State Prize of the Russian Federation laureates
People's Artists of Russia
Honored Artists of the RSFSR
Choreographers of Bolshoi Theatre
Soviet people of Romanian descent
Soviet people of French descent
Men centenarians
Russians in Ukraine
Expatriates from the Russian Empire in France
People from Kievsky Uyezd